Potato virus V (PVV) is a plant pathogenic virus of the family Potyviridae.

External links
ICTVdB - The Universal Virus Database: Potato virus V
Family Groups - The Baltimore Method

Viral plant pathogens and diseases
Potyviruses